Gisleno Santunione (14 April 1924 – 28 September 1991) was an Italian professional football player.

His debut game in the 1942/43 season for A.S. Roma remained the only Serie A game in his career.

References

External links
Profile at Enciclopediadelcalcio.it

1924 births
1991 deaths
Italian footballers
Serie A players
A.S. Roma players
Modena F.C. players
Mantova 1911 players
A.C. Cesena players

Association football midfielders
A.S.D. La Biellese players